Lácteos Lactolanda is a Paraguayan dairy cooperative founded in 1979. It is located in Juan Eulogio Estigarribia in the Caaguazu Department. The cooperative produces 85% of dairy products in Paraguay. Since 2019, Paraguayan footballer Roque Santa Cruz became the face of company through publicity campaigns.

References

External links
 Official Website

Companies established in 1979
Companies of Paraguay